Felber (German and Swiss German: topographic name for someone who lived by a conspicuous willow tree) may refer to:

 Adam Felber, American author and actor
 Barbara K. Felber, American biologist
 Dean Felber, American musician
 Felber Autoroller, Austrian car
 Fred Felber, American football player
 Hans Felber, German general
 René Felber, Swiss politician
 Urs Felber, Swiss industrialist and philanthropist.
German toponymic surnames

Swiss-German surnames